The Wellington tramway system (1878–1964) operated in Wellington, the capital of New Zealand. The tramways were originally owned by a private company, but were purchased by the city and formed a major part of the city's transport system.

Trams
Initially in 1878, Wellington's trams were steam-powered, with an engine drawing a separate carriage. The engines were widely deemed unsatisfactory, however — they created a great deal of soot, were heavy (increasing track maintenance costs), and often frightened horses. By 1882, a combination of public pressure and financial concerns caused the engines to be replaced by horses. In 1902, after the tramways came into public ownership, it was decided to electrify the system, and the first electric tram ran in 1904. Trams operated singly, and were mostly single-deck with some (open-top) double-deck.

History
The first tram line in Wellington opened on 24 August 1878. The line was 4.5 km in length and  gauge; and ran between the north end of Lambton Quay and a point just south of the Basin Reserve. Three steam engines were used, but were replaced by horses by January 1882 because they were noisy and dirty.

The Wellington City Council purchased the tram company and took over from 1 August 1900. The system was electrified with a contract let in 1902, and converted to the new  gauge. The first trial electric tram run was on 8 June 1904, and the first run from Newtown to the Basin Reserve was on 30 June 1904. Extensions in 1904 were to Courtenay Place, Cuba and Wallace Street, Aro Street, Oriental Bay, and Tinakori Road.

The following year, a line was constructed through Newtown and Berhampore to Island Bay, and the year after, from the Te Aro line to Brooklyn. In 1907, a dedicated tram tunnel to Hataitai was completed, allowing services to reach Kilbirnie, Miramar, and Seatoun.

In 1907, the Tinakori Road line was extended westward towards Karori, reaching Karori Cemetery. In February 1911, the line to Karori was extended up Church Hill to Karori Park. The City boundary was at the Wellington Botanic Garden in Tinakori Road and the Karori Borough Council was responsible past the Gardens. As with the Melrose Borough Council in 1903, operation of the city tramways by one council was a factor in the amalgamation of Karori Borough Council with the Wellington City Council in 1920.

Construction of new track then slowed, but did not stop. In 1909, a line was built from Kilbirnie to Lyall Bay and then another from Tinakori Road to Wadestown. In 1915, a line was built to connect Newtown with Kilbirnie, via Constable Street and Crawford Road.

In 1929, the last new line was completed, a branch of the Karori line through a tunnel to Northland. Finally, in 1940, a shorter route was opened up Bowen Street to the western suburbs of Karori and Northland instead of the route via Tinakori Road. This had been proposed since 1907, but successive prime ministers (Ward and Massey) opposed noisy trams using Bowen Street or Hill Street close to parliament. A 1935 demonstration by a Fiducia tram convinced the speaker and members of the Legislative Council that modern trams were silent.

In 1924, a case went to the Court of Appeal of New Zealand challenging the use of eminent domain to secure right-of-ways for tracks. In Boyd v Mayor of Wellington, the court found that, although the government forced the sale of land improperly, it had acted in good faith so the sale was not reversed.

Wellington's more northerly suburbs, such as Johnsonville and Tawa, were not served by the tram network, as they were (and are) served by the Wellington railway system. The Wellington Cable Car, another part of Wellington's transport network, is sometimes described as a tram, but is not generally considered so. It was opened in 1902, and is still in operation.

The steam and horse trams were  gauge, also narrow and the same as New Zealand's national railway gauge.

Map
The map below shows the Wellington tramway network at its greatest extent, superimposed on a map of the city as it is today.

Closure
In the late 1940s and early 1950s, it was decided to replace the trams with buses and trolleybuses, which were seen as more advanced and better suited to the city's needs. The topography of Wellington played a part in this decision – the city's streets are often steep, winding, and narrow, making the greater manoeuvrability of buses a significant asset. The principle of electric transport was retained – many of the tram routes were served by trolleybuses until 2017, see Trolleybuses in Wellington.

The first major line closure came in 1949, when Wadestown closed. The following year the Oriental Bay line closed. In 1954, the Karori line (including the Northland branch) closed. In 1957 services to Aro Street and Brooklyn ended, and the construction of Wellington International Airport destroyed the route to Miramar and Seatoun. All services to the eastern suburbs had ceased by 1962, with Lyall Bay closing in 1960, Constable St/Crawford Rd in 1961, and Hataitai in 1962. (The Hataitai tram tunnel is still in use by buses.) In 1963, the service to Island Bay was withdrawn, leaving mainly inner-city routes. On 2 May 1964, the remaining portion was closed, with a parade from Thorndon to Newtown.

Some of Wellington's old trams have been preserved, and are now in operation at the Wellington Tramway Museum at Paekakariki. Occasionally, it has been suggested that trams should return to Wellington, either in a modern form or as a historical display . As early as 1979 it was suggested to convert the Johnsonville Railway line to tram operation. In 1992 the 'Superlink' plan proposed converting the Johnsonville line to light rail and extending the system to the Airport and Karori via a tunnel from Holloway Road in Aro Valley to Appleton Park, it won the endorsement of many locals and some politicians and prompted further investigation into light rail as a mode of transport for Wellington. In the 1990s, a heritage line was proposed for the city's waterfront, and more recently, a light rail line has been suggested through the city centre. As yet, however, there are no firm plans for any restoration.

List of dates 
The years of opening and closing of various tram routes are:

Present
Heritage trams still operate today, with many examples at the Wellington Tramway Museum at Queen Elizabeth Park in Paekakariki on the Kapiti Coast and at the Museum of Transport and Technology in Auckland.

References

Further reading

External links
Wellington City Libraries tram page
Wellington Tramway Museum
Vehicular Traffic (Carriages, Tramways etc) in Cyclopaedia of New Zealand Volume I (Wellington) of 1897 
Wellington Electric Tram 1904 on 1985 45c stanp
View Photos (405) via Archives Search: search for 'tram', tick images only
Photo of horse tram on The Quay 1900 
Photo of woman tram conductor 1943 
Photo of woman tramway employees repairing track 1944
Article about opening of Lyall Bay line
 

Wellington City
Tram
Rail transport in Wellington
Tram transport in New Zealand
4 ft gauge railways in New Zealand
Wellington